Silver Point may refer to:

Silver Point Capital, a Connecticut-based hedge fund
Silver Point, Tennessee, an unincorporated community in the United States
Silver Point School, a co-ed school in India

See also
Silverpoint, a traditional drawing technique
The term "silver point" may also refer to the freezing point of pure silver, when used as a reference temperature, as in the International Temperature Scale of 1990